Ryan Walker is a retired American soccer forward who played professionally in the USL A-League.

In 1993, Walker began his college career at Sacramento State University.  In 1995, he transferred to Coastal Carolina University.   In his two seasons at Coastal Carolina, he scored twenty-six goals, adding fifteen assists, in forty games.  In February 1997, the Charleston Battery selected Walker in the Territorial round of the 1997 A-League Draft.  Walker did not join Charleston, but signed with the Myrtle Beach Seadawgs of the USISL D-3 Pro League instead.  When David Irving, head coach of the Seadawgs moved to the Wilmington Hammerheads in 1999, Walker made the move as well. He was First Team All League that season. The Hammerheads sent Walker on loan to the Charleston Battery for the Battery’s final regular season game.  In 2000, Walker moved up to the Raleigh Capital Express of the USL A-League.  Raleigh ceased operations at the end of the season and in February 2001, Walker moved to the Atlanta Silverbacks where he finished his career.

References

Living people
1974 births
American soccer players
Atlanta Silverbacks players
Charleston Battery players
Coastal Carolina Chanticleers men's soccer players
Myrtle Beach Seadawgs players
Raleigh (Capital) Express players
Sacramento State Hornets men's soccer players
A-League (1995–2004) players
USL Second Division players
Wilmington Hammerheads FC players
Soccer players from California
Soccer players from South Dakota
Sportspeople from Rapid City, South Dakota
Association football forwards